Moulin-sous-Touvent is a commune in the Oise department in northern France.

History

First World War
Lying on the front lines of the Western Front, the commune was occupied by Germany and liberated by the Allies. 
.

The stone quarries of Moulin-sous-Touvent, exploited since the Middle Ages, were occupied in 1914 by the German forces, who took over the dormitories and expanded the underground network, creating hundreds of meters of new galleries.

See also
Communes of the Oise department

References

Communes of Oise